Johanna Winter (born 21 May 1942) is an Australian-German fencer. She competed for Australia at the 1960 and 1964 Summer Olympics.

References

1942 births
Living people
Australian female foil fencers
German emigrants to Australia
Olympic fencers of Australia
Fencers at the 1960 Summer Olympics
Fencers at the 1964 Summer Olympics
Commonwealth Games medallists in fencing
Commonwealth Games silver medallists for Australia
Fencers at the 1962 British Empire and Commonwealth Games
Medallists at the 1962 British Empire and Commonwealth Games